Big Springs is an unincorporated community in Marion Township, Boone County, in the U.S. state of Indiana.

History
A post office at Big Springs (also historically called Big Spring and Bigspring) operated between 1883 and 1900.

Geography

References

Unincorporated communities in Boone County, Indiana
Unincorporated communities in Indiana